Evelyn Robins Abbott, CIE (9 May 1873 – 7 May 1950) was an administrator in British India. A member of the Indian Civil Service, he was Chief Commissioner of Delhi from 1924 until his retirement in 1928.

After returning to England, Abbott served as chairman of the Wallingford Rural District Council from 1939 until his death and was a member of the Berkshire County Council from 1939 to 1946.

References 

 "Obituary", The Daily Telegraph, 10 May 1950, p. 3
 "Mr E. R. Abbott", The Times, 10 May 1950, p. 8
 https://www.ukwhoswho.com/view/10.1093/ww/9780199540891.001.0001/ww-9780199540884-e-221687

1873 births
1950 deaths
Indian Civil Service (British India) officers
Companions of the Order of the Indian Empire
People educated at Bath College
Alumni of Balliol College, Oxford
Members of Berkshire County Council
Members of the Council of State (India)
British people in colonial India